Paulo Renato (1924-1981) was a Portuguese actor. He appeared in numerous plays and films and became very popular in Portugal during the 1950s and 1960s.

Born in Lisbon, on October 23, 1924, he started his career in 1946, with the theater group Pedro Bom. As a stage actor, his most notable appearance was in the play A Severa (1955), where he starred alongside Amália Rodrigues. He also made cinema — Sol e Toiros (1949), Quando o Mar Galgou a Terra (1954), Os Verdes Anos (1963) e Estrada da Vida (1968) among other films. He appeared in Portuguese and international TV series — such as Ivone a Faz Tudo (1978), Millionen nach Maß (1970) or Le Comte de Monte-Cristo (1980) — and TV shows —  like Zip-Zip (1969), where he made some comical sketches with Raul Solnado.

Paulo Renato died on September 26, 1981.

References
 http://www.infopedia.pt/$paulo-renato. Infopédia. Retrieved on 2008-10-28. [In Portuguese.]

External links
 

1924 births
1981 deaths
Portuguese male film actors
Male actors from Lisbon
20th-century Portuguese male actors
Portuguese male stage actors
Portuguese male television actors